The Journal of Safety Research is a quarterly peer-reviewed academic journal covering all aspects of safety and health research. It was established in 1969 and is published jointly by Elsevier and the National Safety Council. The editor-in-chief is Thomas Planek (National Safety Council). According to the Journal Citation Reports, the journal has a 2014 impact factor of 1.870.

References

External links

Occupational safety and health journals
Elsevier academic journals
Quarterly journals
Publications established in 1969
English-language journals